Rocky Point, California may refer to:
 Rocky Point, Lompoc Valley, Santa Barbara, California
 Rocky Point, Lower Lake, California
 Rocky Point, Weldon, California
 Rocky Point, Susanville, California
 Rocky Point, Lake Isabella, California
 Rocky Point, Jenner, California
 Rocky Point, Lakeport, California
 Rocky Point, La Jolla, California
 Rocky Point, Twentynine Palms, California